Benscliffe Wood is a  biological Site of Special Scientific Interest  in Leicestershire.

This wood has one of the richest varieties of lichens in the East Midlands, with over thirty species growing on Precambrian rocks. Eleven of the species are rare in the county.

The site is private land with no public access.

References

Sites of Special Scientific Interest in Leicestershire